, better known by her stage name , is a Japanese actress, voice actress and singer represented by Aoni Production. She voiced Komachi Hikigaya in My Youth Romantic Comedy Is Wrong, As I Expected, Rita Rossweisse in Honkai Impact 3rd, Tanya von Degurechaff in The Saga of Tanya the Evil, Lucy in Ninjala, Lumine in Genshin Impact, Nodoka Hanadera/Cure Grace in Healin' Good PreCure, Krul Tepes in Seraph of the End, Madoka Kaname in Puella Magi Madoka Magica, Hibiki Tachibana in Senki Zesshou Symphogear, Diane in The Seven Deadly Sins, Tamaki Kotatsu in Fire Force, Mami Nanami in Rent-A-Girlfriend, the young Murasaki Kuhōin in Kure-nai, Kumoko/Shiraori in So I'm a Spider, So What?, Lucy in Cyberpunk: Edgerunners, and Futaba Sakura in Persona 5.

Biography
Yūki was born in Chiba Prefecture. She entered the entertainment industry at the age of four. As a child, she acted in films and dramas. From 1999 to 2002, she made regular appearances on the variety shows Appare Sanma Dai-sensei and Yappari Sanma Dai-sensei which aired on Fuji TV. When she was in fifth grade, she made her debut as a voice actress.

In late 2006, she was affiliated with the theater company Central. After her admission to high school in August 2007, she joined the agency Breath, changing her stage name to Aoi Yūki. She got her first major role in 2008 in Kure-nai as Murasaki Kuhōin. In August of the same year, she moved to the agency Pro-Fit. In 2009, she starred in two anime: Anyamaru Tantei Kiruminzuu as Mikogami Riko and Yumeiro Patissiere as Amano Ichigo, respectively. After that, she voiced the female protagonists of several of her series, notably Iris from Pokémon: Best Wishes! and Victorique de Blois from Gosick.

She graduated from high school in March 2010 and university in March 2014.

In 2011, Yūki voiced Madoka Kaname in Puella Magi Madoka Magica. In October of the same year, she won the award for best voice actor in the Newtype x Machi Asobi Anime Awards. She was awarded the Best Lead Actress Award in the sixth Seiyu Awards. In 2013, Yūki and Ayana Taketatsu, formed the singing unit Petit Milady. Together, they performed the song , which was used as the third opening theme to the 2013 anime television series Yu-Gi-Oh! Zexal II, and in 2014, performed the song "Azurite", which was used as the opening theme for the 2014 anime series The Pilot's Love Song. She has also played Hibiki Tachibana in Symphogear, Yuuki Konno in Sword Art Online II, Tanya Degurechaff in The Saga of Tanya the Evil, Yoshiko Hanabatake in Aho-Girl, Nodoka Hanadera/Cure Grace in Healin' Good Pretty Cure, and Futaba Sakura in Persona 5. In 2019, she played as Tamaki Kotatsu in Fire Force, and reprised her role at the second season.

Beyond voice acting, Yūki is also a digital artist and illustrator, making several fanart of anime she had voiced in. She also created her own original character project "YUKI×AOI Chimera Project" in 2019 in the hopes to be greenlit for an anime adaptation.

On April 28, 2017, the official fan website AoimAniA announced that she would take a temporary break from her music career. After the closure of her website and fan club, she resumed her music activities under Nippon Columbia.

Filmography

Television animation

Original video animation (OVA)

Original net animation (ONA)

Theatrical animation

Video games

Drama CDs
Arpeggio of Blue Steel, Iona, I-400, I-402
Fate/GUDAGUDA Order, Okita Souji
Himawari-san, Ami Minami
My Sweet Tyrant, Non Katagiri.
Taiyō no Ie, Mao Motomiya
Sacrificial Princess and the King of Beasts, Saliphie
Vampire Knight Memories, Kiryu Ren

Live action

Dubbing roles
Live-action

Animation

Music
On March 28, 2012, she released her first solo album Petipa. Her first single, "VisuMania", was released on January 29, 2014, which is used as the ending theme to the anime television series World Conquest Zvezda Plot.

Awards

References

External links
  
  
  
  
 
 
 

1992 births
Living people
20th-century Japanese actresses
21st-century Japanese actresses
Japanese child actresses
Japanese women pop singers
Japanese television personalities
Japanese video game actresses
Japanese voice actresses
Aoni Production voice actors
Musicians from Chiba Prefecture
Seiyu Award winners
Voice actresses from Chiba Prefecture
Waseda University alumni